Aranxa Jesús Vega Gaviria (born 26 August 1997) is a Peruvian footballer who plays as a left back for Club Universitario de Deportes and the Peru women's national team.

International career
Vega represented Peru at two South American U-20 Women's Championship editions (2014 and 2015) and the 2017 Bolivarian Games. At senior level, she played two Copa América Femenina editions (2014 and 2018).

References

1997 births
Living people
Women's association football fullbacks
Peruvian women's footballers
Peru women's international footballers
Club Universitario de Deportes footballers